Kaun Hai? is an Indian Hindi horror anthology television series produced by Contiloe Entertainment. It premiered 29 June 2018 on Colors TV and ended on 14 October that same year, lasting two seasons.

Kaun Hai? season 1 featured an episodic cast and finished off with 33 episodes on 16 September 2018 to make way for Kaun Hai? 2, a series for 8 episodes starring real-life couple Vatsal Sheth and Ishita Dutta with Amrapali Gupta in a negative role.

Plot

Season 1
The program is based on that real fear, experienced by people in haunted places.

Season 2
The story starts with a battle of the Daityas and the Puranas because the Daityas wanted to open the door to hell and take control of the world by letting Asuras run rampant. While the Daityas are Diti (Amrapali Gupta), her elder son Hiranyakashipu (Arpit Ranka), and her younger son Hiranyaksha (Vatsal Sheth); the Puranas include Hiranyakashipu's son, Prahlad, and his teacher Anandi (Neetha Shetty), both of whom are devotees of Lord Vishnu. In the battle, Hrinayakashipu is killed by Vishnu’s Narasimha avatar. Later, Hiranyaksha also dies at the hands of Vishnu, but he vows that he will reincarnate to fulfill his destiny and make his mother the queen of the world.

Thousands of years later, a child named Yatin Chaudhary is born and is revealed to be Hiranyaksha's reincarnation. Diti starts working in the Chaudhary house as Yatin’s nanny. Diti’s reality is found out by Krishika, Yatin’s biological mother, but Krishika is killed by her.

25 Years Later

Yatin has grown up and is a 24 year-old boy, having the powers of Hiranyaksha from his past with the help of Diti, who has confined Krishika’s spirit in a secret room to suppress Yatin’s goodness. Hiranyakashipu’s spirit is alive through the flames and he meets Yatin and Diti. He tells them to complete the mission so he can be alive again.

The next day, Yatin sees Vaishnavi (Ishita Dutta), a beautiful innocent girl who is the daughter of Dutta (Inder's rival). Later it is revealed that Vaishnavi is the reincarnation of Vishnu’s Narasimha avatar. Vaishnavi is unaware of her real identity.

Diti encourages Yatin to kill Vaishnavi, but only after they get married. The only way to get the doors of hell to open is by killing Vaishnavi and stealing her powers. Her powers will awaken only after her marriage with Yatin.

Yatin woos Vaishnavi as per plan. However, Vaishnavi’s dad is against their relationship. Diti calls upon a blood-sucking witch to control Dutta and get him to agree to the wedding.

Meanwhile, Anandi tries to reveal Vaishnavi’s real identity to her but Vaishnavi isn’t willing to trust her and thinks Anandi is crazy.

Yatin's goodness starts to prevail over him and he starts falling for Vaishnavi. Vaishnavi and Yatin get married even after the Puranas try to stop their union. After the wedding, Vaishnavi starts gaining her power.

Later, Yatin fails to kill Vaishnavi on their wedding night and realizes he truly loves her and can’t hurt her. Vaishnavi learns the truth about herself and her destiny. She is hurt to know that Yatin betrayed her.

On the other hand, Prahlada sacrifices himself to bring his father back to life so Vaishnavi can end him once and for all.

Hiranyakashipu encourages Yatin to kill Vaishnavi but Yatin isn’t able to. In rage, Hiranyakashipu stabs Yatin and decides to take revenge on Narashima for what happened in the past. However, he ends up dying the same death.

Time runs out as the three stars go past their alignment. Diti vanishes as Asuras are eliminated once and for all. Yatin dies in Vaishnavi’s arms and vows to be with her in each reincarnation.

Production
Kaun Hai? is created by Abhimanyu Singh and is produced by his company Contiloe Pictures, which also created successful horror shows like Ssshhhh...Phir Koi Hai and Fear Files: Darr Ki Sacchi Tasvirein for Star One and Zee TV respectively.

Colors programming head, Manisha Sharma said, "Through Kaun Hai? we are going back to the basics and reviving the genre to make our entertainment catalogue robust."

The series has been filmed in various parts of India. Abhimanyu Singh - CEO Contiloe Pictures said "Kaun Hai has been shot extensively across location in various parts of the country such as Kashmir, Rajasthan, Gujarat, Calcutta, Madhya Pradesh to name a few."

First episode was shot in Kashmir and starred Shaleen Bhanot. "It was shot in Kashmir and I am very fascinated by hills and mountains. It was great fun," said Bhanot.

Reception
The first episode of the show received 3.89 million impressions, and ranked at 11th position in the list of top 20 Hindi TV shows.

Response from artists
Some actors experienced spooky experiences while shooting. Bhanot said, "I never used to believe in ghosts until ‘Kaun Hai?’. But I had a couple of spooky experiences while shooting." Speaking about the story, he said that the story was "brilliant and scary". While shooting in a haveli, Ishita Ganguly said that "she experienced an eerie feeling around her at all times". Charu Asopa who shot for the episode "Warehouse No. 4", found its story interesting. "The reason for taking up horror series once again was the intriguing concept of Nightshift", she said. She found the story so scary that she "found it hard to get proper sleep".

Rajkummar Rao and Shraddha Kapoor acted in "Stree visits a haunted studio" aired on 31 August 2018 for the promotion of their film Stree.

Season-1
Every week, two stories are telecast with one story being split into two episodes and the other story being shown in a single episode. Each story has a different star cast.

Season-2

Main Cast
 Vatsal Sheth as Hiranyaksha / Yatin Chaudhary
 Ishita Dutta as Vaishnavi / Vaishnavi Yatin Chaudhary 
 Ashish Dixit as Ankit Arora
 Amrapali Gupta as Diti / Diti Inder Chaudhary
 Neetha Shetty as Anandi
 Arpit Ranka as Hiranyakashipu

See also
 List of Hindi horror shows

International broadcast

References

2018 Indian television series debuts
Hindi-language television shows
Colors TV original programming
Indian anthology television series
Indian horror fiction television series
Indian supernatural television series
Paranormal reality television series
2018 Indian television series endings